A xylotheque or xylothek (from the Greek  for "wood" and  meaning "repository") is special form of herbarium that consists of a collection of authenticated wood specimens. It is also known as a xylarium (from the Greek  for "wood" and Latin  meaning "separate place"). Traditionally, xylotheque specimens were in the form of book-shaped volumes, each made of a particular kind of wood and holding samples of the different parts of the corresponding plant. While the terms are often used interchangeably, some use xylotheque to refer to these older collections of wooden 'books' and xylarium for modern collections in which some or all of the specimens are in simpler shapes, such as blocks or plaques with information engraved on their surfaces. Many countries have at least one xylotheque with native flora, and some also house flora from other parts of the world. They are valuable to specialists in forestry, botany, conservation, forensics, art restoration, paleontology, archaeology, and other fields.

History
Xylotheques date back to the later 17th century, when wood specimens began to appear in cabinets of curiosity. Over time, they grew larger and more systematic, with hundreds of individual volumes in a single collection. The oldest extant collection was established in 1823 at the University of Leningrad, and by the middle of the century they had been established in many European countries. Australia now houses 12 xylaria holding 11% of the world's wood specimens, while the Oxford Forestry Institute's xylarium holds about 13%.

In older xylotheques, the wooden volumes were typically made out of the same wood as the specimens inside and sometimes decorated with tree bark and associated lichens and mosses. Each volume housed seeds, flowers, twigs, and leaves from the corresponding tree or bush, along with a written description hidden in a small compartment set into the inner spine. An alternative form of xylotheque found in Japan and elsewhere featured paintings of the plant parts rather than actual field specimens.  

Even a modest collection of wood samples has value, as each of its samples has a particular history. Xylotheques provide comparison samples for xylotomy, art historical studies, and scientific studies of the physical and mechanical properties of wood, such as durability and preservation. Xylotheques are also useful for anyone who needs to make a morphological-visual analysis of wood.

The xylotheque with the largest number of samples is the Samuel James Record Collection in the United States, which holds 98,000 samples. Formerly housed at the Forestry School of Yale University in New Haven, Connecticut, it was transferred to the U.S. Forest Service's Forest Products Laboratory in 1969. The second largest xylotheque belongs to the Royal Museum of Central Africa in Tervuren, Belgium, with 57,000 samples. The Thünen Institute of Wood Research in Hamburg has more than 37,000 samples.

Selected xylotheques

Index xylariorum
The Index xylariorum is a listing of the world's xylaria. It was conceived of by William Louis Stern (1926– ) who first published the work in 1967. A subsequent work in 1981 was published by the Botanic Garden of the Polish Academy of Sciences as "No. 1" of the series. Stern then published the third revised edition of this work in 1988. Anna H. Lynch and Peter E. Gasson compiled Index Xylariorum 4.1 in 2010, and the International Association of Wood Anatomists updated the list in 2016 under the supervision of Frederic Lens. In addition to the link to the PDF of this document provided in the reference list of this article, Index Xylariorum 4.1 can also be accessed online as a database through the Global Timber Tracking Network website here.

Below is a list of the Index xylariorum codes, locations, and institutional names included by Stern in his 1988 Index xylariorum. This list is provided for historic context.

In popular culture
For documenta 13 in 2012, American artist Mark Dion created a new hexagonal display chamber for the Schildbach Xylotheque at the Natural History Museum in Kassel, Germany. As part of the project, he created six new volumes made of wood from each of the continents (excluding Antarctica).

See also
List of woods
Arboretum
Botanical gardens

Notes

External links
 Xiloteca Manuel Soler — one of the largest private xylotheques

Wood
Botany
Botanical gardens
Forestry museums
Herbaria